Michel Charlin Tcheumaleu  (born 21 April 1975 in Ebolowa) is a Cameroonian footballer, who plays for Thailand Premier League club side Samut Songkhram FC.

References

1975 births
Living people
Cameroonian footballers
Cameroonian expatriates in France
Expatriate footballers in Thailand
Expatriate footballers in France
Cameroonian expatriate sportspeople in Thailand
Sable FC players
People from Ebolowa
Association football midfielders